Ame Votoniu (born 12 August 1985) is a Fijian footballer who plays as a defender or midfielder for Fijian club Nadi and the Fiji national team.

Club career
Votoniu started his career with Tavua. In 2012 he moved to Nadi.

National team
In 2017 Votoniu was called up by coach Christophe Gamel for the Fiji national football team. He made his debut on November 19, 2017, in a 2–0 loss against Estonia. He came into the field replacing Narendra Rao in the 67th minute of play.

International goals
Scores and results list Fiji's goal tally first.

References

Fijian footballers
Association football defenders
Association football midfielders
Nadi F.C. players
Tavua F.C. players
Fiji international footballers
Living people
1985 births